Thalassocola is a genus of bacteria from the order of Rhodospirillales, with one known species (Thalassocola ureilytica).

References

Rhodospirillales
Bacteria genera
Monotypic bacteria genera